The Sligo Junior Football Championship is an annual Gaelic football competition contested by lower-tier Sligo GAA clubs.

Bunninadden have the biggest number of titles with six. Shamrock Gaels are the title holders (2022) defeating Naomh Molaise Gaels in the Final.

Honours
The winners of the Sligo Junior Championship qualify to represent their county in the Connacht Junior Club Football Championship. The winners of that in 2018 were Easkey and stalwart Eugene Mullen captained them to that.

The winners can, in turn, go on to play in the All-Ireland Junior Club Football Championship. Easkey got to the All-Ireland final in 2019. But they lost to Beaufort when they were there. That was played at Croke Park.

The trophy given to the winners of the Sligo Junior Football Championship is called ?

The winners are promoted to the Sligo Intermediate Football Championship for the following year.

History
In 2009 the Junior Championship was restructured. For the first time since 2001 there would be two championships, A and B. The A Championship was made up of the semi-finalists in 2008 and relegated teams from the Intermediate Championship. The winner of the A Championship is promoted to Intermediate football. The relegated teams from Intermediate drop down to Junior A and in 2009 three teams were relegated. The B Championship was run on a knockout basis with nine teams entering. The winner of the B Championship is promoted to A for the following year.

Eamonn O'Hara, one of Sligo's All Star footballers, played in the 2016 final and he scored 2-1 before the first half ended.

List of finals

Roll of honour

Roll of honour only goes as far as 2011, needs updating.

Junior B Championship

Roll of honour only goes as far as 2011, needs updating.

References

External links
Official Sligo Website
Sligo on Hoganstand
Sligo Club GAA

3